Statistics of Primera Fuerza in season 1935-36.

Overview
It was contested by 5 teams, and Club España won the championship.

League standings

Top goalscorers
Players sorted first by goals scored, then by last name.

References
Mexico - List of final tables (RSSSF)

1935-36
Mex
1935–36 in Mexican football